Stephen Waddington is a management consultant and public relations adviser. He founded and serves as managing partner of Wadds Inc., a business advisory firm that works with advertising agencies and communications groups. He is also an author of several books and a Visiting Professor at Newcastle University.

Career 
Waddington is a former President of the Chartered Institute of Public Relations and a former executive at Ketchum Inc.

Books and publications 

 Brand Anarchy: Managing corporate reputation (2012)
 Share This: The Social Media Handbook for PR Professionals (2012)
 Share This Too: More Social Media Solutions for PR Professionals (2013)
 Brand Vandals
 Platinum: A celebration of the 70th anniversary of the CIPR
 Exploring Public Relations and Management Communication (2020)

References 

Living people
1970 births